Burt Goldberg is a Clinical Professor of Chemistry at New York University. Goldberg received his B.S. from Pace University, an M.Phil from Mt. Sinai School of Medicine, and a Ph.D. from the University of Cardiff. Prior to retiring from research, his main area of focus was in microbiology.

Career
He has been a visiting faculty member at Barnard College.   He is one of the faculty at NYU to plan to deliver all of his lectures on the web in a general course, with the class time used instead for discussions. His course,  "The Body: How It Works" will be first taught in this format in 2011, but the lectures are expected to be available to the public in 2010.

Achievements and honours
He has received the S.H. Hutner Award for Research Contributions to Protozoology (2004) and the Golden Dozen-Teaching Award for Excellence in Undergraduate Teaching at NYU (2006).

References

External links
NYU web page

New York University faculty
Living people
Year of birth missing (living people)
Icahn School of Medicine at Mount Sinai alumni
Pace University alumni